Bus rapid transit (BRT), also called a busway or transitway, is a bus-based public transport system designed to have much more capacity, reliability and other quality features than a conventional bus system. Typically, a BRT system includes roadways that are dedicated to buses, and gives priority to buses at intersections where buses may interact with other traffic; alongside design features to reduce delays caused by passengers boarding or leaving buses, or paying fares. BRT aims to combine the capacity and speed of a light rail or metro system (LRT, HRT) with the flexibility, lower cost and simplicity of a bus system.

The world's first BRT system was the Busway in Runcorn New Town, England, which entered service in 1971.

The majority of these are in Latin America, where about 19.6 million passengers ride daily, and which has the most cities with BRT systems, with 54, led by Brazil with 21 cities. The Latin American countries with the most daily ridership are Brazil (10.7 million), Colombia (3.0 million), and Mexico (2.5 million).

In the other regions, China (4.3 million) and Iran (2.1 million) stand out.

Terminology 
Bus Rapid Transit is a mode of mass rapid transit (MRT) and describes a high-capacity urban public-transit system with its own right of way, vehicles at short headways, platform-level boarding, and preticketing.

The expression "BRT" is mainly used in the Americas and China; in India, it is called "BRTS" (BRT System); in Europe it is often called a "busway" or a "BHLS" (stands for Bus with a High Level of Service);. The term transitway was originated in 1981 with the opening of the OC Transpo transitway in Ottawa, Ontario, Canada.

Critics have charged that the term "bus rapid transit" has sometimes been misapplied to systems that lack most or all the essential features which differentiate it from conventional bus services. The term "bus rapid transit creep" has been used to describe severely degraded levels of bus service which fall far short of the BRT Standard promoted by the Institute for Transportation and Development Policy (ITDP) and other organizations.

Reasons for use 
Compared to other common transit modes such as light rail transit (LRT), bus rapid transit (BRT) service is attractive to transit authorities because it does not cost as much to establish and operate: no track needs to be laid, bus drivers typically require less training and less pay than rail operators, and bus maintenance is less complex than rail maintenance. 

Moreover, buses are more flexible than rail vehicles, because a bus route can be altered, either temporarily or permanently, to meet changing demand or contend with adverse road conditions with comparatively little investment of resources.

History 

The first use of a protected busway was the East Side Trolley Tunnel in Providence, Rhode Island. It was converted from trolley to bus use in 1948. However, the first BRT system in the world was the Busway in Runcorn, England. First conceived in the Runcorn New Town Masterplan in 1966, it opened for services in October 1971 and all  were operational by 1980. The central station is at Runcorn Shopping City where buses arrive on dedicated raised busways to two enclosed stations. Arthur Ling, Runcorn Development Corporation's Master Planner, said that he had invented the concept while sketching on the back of an envelope.

The second BRT system in the world was the Rede Integrada de Transporte (RIT, integrated transportation network), implemented in Curitiba, Brazil, in 1974. The Rede Integrada de Transporte was inspired by the previous transport system of the National Urban Transport Company of Peru (In Spanish: ENATRU), which only had quick access on Lima downtown, but it would not be considered BRT itself. Many of the elements that have become associated with BRT were innovations first suggested by Carlos Ceneviva, within the team of Curitiba Mayor Jaime Lerner. Initially just dedicated bus lanes in the center of major arterial roads, in 1980 the Curitiba system added a feeder bus network and inter-zone connections, and in 1992 introduced off-board fare collection, enclosed stations, and platform-level boarding. Other systems made further innovations, including platooning (three buses entering and leaving bus stops and traffic signals at once) in Porto Alegre, and passing lanes and express service in São Paulo.

After the opening of the West Busway,  in length in 2000, Pittsburgh's Busway system is today over 18.5 miles long.

The OC Transpo BRT system in Ottawa, Canada, was introduced in 1983. The first element of its BRT system was dedicated bus lanes through the city centre, with platformed stops. The introduction of exclusive separate busways (termed 'Transitway') occurred in 1983. By 1996, all of the originally envisioned 31 km Transitway system was in operation; further expansions were opened in 2009, 2011, and 2014.  As of 2019, the central part of the Transitway has been converted to light rail transit, due to the downtown section being operated beyond its designed capacity.

In 1995, Quito, Ecuador, opened trolleybus BRT and Morocco Marrakech(BHNS de Marrakech)in 2017 Corridors of 8 km (5.0 mi), of which 3 km (1.9 mi) is wired for operation as trolleybus. The TransMilenio in Bogotá, Colombia, opening in 2000, was the first BRT system to combine the best elements of Curitiba's BRT with other BRT advances, and achieved the highest capacity and highest speed BRT system in the world.

In January 2004 the first BRT in Southeast Asia, TransJakarta, opened in Jakarta, Indonesia.

Africa's first BRT system was opened in Lagos, Nigeria, in March 2008 but is considered a light BRT system by many people. Johannesburg's BRT, Rea Vaya, was the first true BRT in Africa, in August 2009, carrying 16,000 daily passengers. Rea Vaya and MIO (BRT in Cali, Colombia, opened 2009) were the first two systems to combine full BRT with some services that also operated in mixed traffic, then joined the BRT trunk infrastructure.

Main features 

BRT systems normally include most of the following features:

Dedicated lanes and alignment 

Bus-only lanes make for faster travel and ensure that buses are not delayed by mixed traffic congestion. A median alignment bus-only keeps buses away from busy curb-side side conflicts, where cars and trucks are parking, standing and turning. Separate rights of way may be used such as the completely elevated Xiamen BRT. Transit malls or 'bus streets' may also be created in city centers.

Off-board fare collection 
Fare prepayment at the station, instead of on board the bus, eliminates the delay caused by passengers paying on board. Use of a payment card which must be touched briefly to a card-reader is also fast.

For the system to work, users can receive "credit" on the electronic cards: in this manner, passengers who have no money left on the cards can take the bus at sidewalk stops where there is no possibility to recharge these cards. This means that the balance in the card can be negative, up to two ticket fares, so passengers can take the bus in the street and recharge the card once they reach a main line station. As the card itself costs more than the maximum negative balance, the passenger has no incentive to default on negative credit. Transmilenio in Bogotá followed suit in 2014 also creating routes that can use main line stations and regular sidewalk stations, but instead of giving credit to passengers to allow boarding the bus on sidewalks, published a map readable in smart phones giving the location of a dense network of 4,000 recharging points, located in internet cafes and other business, that use a swipe-card terminal for recharging. This system has the additional benefit of diminishing queues on main line stations.

Bus priority, turning and standing restrictions 
Prohibiting turns for traffic across the bus lane significantly reduces delays to the buses. Bus priority will often be provided at signalized intersections to reduce delays by extending the green phase or reducing the red phase in the required direction compared to the normal sequence. Prohibiting turns may be the most important measure for moving buses through intersections.

Platform-level boarding 

Station platforms should be level with the bus floor for quick and easy boarding, making it fully accessible for wheelchairs, disabled passengers and baby strollers, with minimal delays.

High-level platforms for high-floored buses makes it difficult to have stops outside dedicated platforms, or to have conventional buses stop at high-level platforms, so these BRT stops are distinct from street-level bus stops. Similar to rail vehicles, there is a risk of a dangerous gap between bus and platform, and is even greater due to the nature of bus operations. Kassel curbs or other methods may be used to ease quick and safe alignment of the BRT vehicle with a platform.

A popular compromise is low-floor buses with a low step at the door, which can allow easy boarding at low-platform stops compatible with other buses. This intermediate design may be used with some low- or medium-capacity BRT systems.

The MIO system in Cali pioneered in 2009 the use of dual buses, with doors on the left side of the bus that are located at the height of high-level platforms, and doors on the right side that are located at curb height. These buses can use the main line with its exclusive lanes and high level platforms, located on the center of the street and thus, boarding and leaving passengers on the left side. These buses can exit the main line and use normal lanes that share with other vehicles and stop at regular stations located on sidewalks on the right side of the street.

Additional features 
Groups of criteria form the BRT Standard 2016, which is updated by the Technical Committee of the BRT Standard.

High capacity vehicles 

High-capacity vehicles such as articulated or even bi-articulated buses may be used, typically with multiple doors for fast entry and exit. Double-decker buses or guided buses may also be used. Advanced powertrain control may be used for a smoother ride.

Quality stations 

Bottleneck BRT stations typically provide loading areas for simultaneus boarding and alighting of buses through multiple doors coordinated via displays and loudspeakers. 

An example of high-quality stations include those used on TransMilenio in Bogotá since December 2000, the MIO in Cali since November 2008, Metrolinea in Bucaramanga since December 2009, Megabús in Pereira since May 2009. This design is also used in Johannesburg's Rea Vaya. 

The term "station" is more flexibly applied in North America and ranges from enclosed waiting areas (Ottawa and Cleveland) to large open-sided shelters (Los Angeles and San Bernardino).

Prominent brand or identity 
A unique and distinctive identity can contribute to BRT's attractiveness as an alternative to driving cars, (such as Viva, Max, TransMilenio, Metropolitano, Metronit, Select) marking stops and stations as well as the buses.

Large cities usually have big bus networks. A map showing all bus lines might be incomprehensible, and cause people to wait for low-frequency buses that may not even be running at the time they are needed. By identifying the main bus lines having high-frequency service, with a special brand and separate maps, it is easier to understand the entire network.

Public transit apps are more convenient than a static map, featuring services like trip planning, live arrival and departure times, up-to-date line schedules, local station maps, service alerts, and advisories that may affect one's current trip. Transit and Moovit are examples of apps that are available in many cities around the world. Some operators of bus rapid transit systems have developed their own apps, like Transmilenio. These apps even include all the schedules and live arrival times and stations for buses that feed the BRT, like the SITP (Sistema Integrado de Transporte Público or Public Transit Integrated System) in Bogotá.

In tunnels or subterranean structures 

A special issue arises in the use of buses in metro transit structures. Since the areas where the demand for an exclusive bus right-of-way are apt to be in dense downtown areas where an above-ground structure may be unacceptable on historic, logistic, or environmental grounds, use of BRT in tunnels may not be avoidable.

Since buses are usually powered by internal combustion engines, bus metros raise ventilation issues similar to those of motor vehicle tunnels. Powerful fans typically exchange air through ventilation shafts to the surface; these are usually as remote as possible from occupied areas, to minimize the effects of noise and concentrated pollution.

A straightforward way to reduce air quality problems is to use internal combustion engines with lower emissions. The 2008 Euro V European emission standards set a limit on carbon monoxide from heavy-duty diesel engines of 1.5 g/kWh, one third of the 1992 Euro I standard. As a result, less forced ventilation will be required in tunnels to achieve the same air quality.

Another alternative is to use electric propulsion, which Seattle's Metro Bus Tunnel and Boston's Silver Line Phase II implemented. In Seattle, dual-mode (electric/diesel electric) buses manufactured by Breda were used until 2004, with the center axle driven by electric motors obtaining power from trolley wires through trolley poles in the subway, and with the rear axle driven by a conventional diesel powertrain on freeways and streets. Boston is using a similar approach, after initially using trolleybuses pending delivery of the dual-mode vehicles in 2005.

In 2004, Seattle replaced its "Transit Tunnel" fleet with diesel-electric hybrid buses, which operate similarly to hybrid cars outside the tunnel and in a low-noise, low-emissions "hush mode" (in which the diesel engine operates but does not exceed idle speed) when underground. The need to provide electric power in underground environments brings the capital and maintenance costs of such routes closer to those of light rail, and raises the question of building or eventually converting to light rail. In Seattle, the downtown transit tunnel was retrofitted for conversion to a shared hybrid-bus and light-rail facility in preparation for Seattle's Central Link Light Rail line, which opened in July 2009. In March 2019, expansion of the light rail in the tunnel moved busses back to surface streets. 

Bi-articulated battery electric buses cause no problems in tunnels anymore but provide BRT capacity.

Performance 

A BRT system can be measured by a number of factors. The BRT Standard was developed by the Institute for Transportation and Development Policy (ITDP) to score BRT corridors, producing a list of rated BRT corridors meeting the minimum definition of BRT. The highest rated systems received a "gold" ranking. The latest edition of the standard was published in 2016.

Other metrics used to evaluate BRT performance include:
 The vehicle headway is the average time interval between vehicles on the same line. Buses can operate at headways of 10 seconds or less, but average headways on TransMilenio at busy intersections are 13 seconds, 14 seconds for the busiest section of the Metrobus (Istanbul), 7 seconds in Belo Horizonte, 6 seconds in Rio de Janeiro.
 Vehicle capacity, which can range from 50 passengers for a conventional bus up to some 300 for a bi-articulated vehicle or 500.
 The effectiveness of the stations to handle passenger demand. High volumes of passengers on vehicles require large bus stations and more boarding areas at busy interchange points. This is the standard bottleneck of BRT (and HRT). 
 The effectiveness of the feeder system: can these deliver people to stations at the required speed?
 Local passenger demand. Without enough local demand for travel, the capacity will not be used.

Based on this data, the minimum headway and maximum current vehicle capacities, the theoretical maximum throughput measured in passengers per hour per direction (PPHPD) for a single traffic lane is some 150,000 passengers per hour (250 passengers per vehicle, one vehicle every 6 seconds). In real world conditions BRT Rio (de Janeiro, BRS Presidente Vargas) with 65.000 PPHPD holds the record,  TransMilenio Bogotá and Metrobus Istanbul perform 49,000 – 45,000 PPHPD,  most other busy systems operating in the 15,000 to 25,000 range.

Research of the Institute for Transportation and Development Policy (ITDP) shows a capacity ranking of MRT modes, based on reported performance of 14 LRT systems, 14 HRT systems (just 1-track +  3  2-track-systems "highest capacity") and 56 BRT systems.  

The study concludes, that BRT-„capacity on TransMilenio exceeds all but the highest capacity HRT systems, and it far exceeds the highest LRT system.“ 

Performance data of 84 systems show

 37,700  passengers in peak hour per direction (PPHPD) in the best BRT system
 36,000 in the best 1-track-HRT system
 13,400 in the best LRT system

More topical are these BRT data 

 45,000 PPHPD in a 1-lane-system using articulated buses (2020 in Istanbul) 
 320 busses per hour per direction in the corridor Nossa Senhora de Copacabana in Rio de Janeiro for the year 2014 meaning a bus every 11 seconds. 
 65,400 PPHPD in 600 buses in the corridor Presidente Vargas in Rio de Janeiro for the years 2012 resp. 2014, which means 10 buses per minute or a bus every 6 seconds.

Comparison with light rail 

After the first BRT system opened in 1971, cities were slow to adopt BRT because they believed that the capacity of BRT was limited to about 12,000 passengers per hour traveling in a given direction during peak demand. While this is a capacity rarely needed in the US (12,000 is more typical as a total daily ridership), in the developing world this capacity constraint (or rumor of a capacity constraint) was a significant argument in favor of heavy rail metro investments in some venues.

When TransMilenio opened in 2000, it changed the paradigm by giving buses a passing lane at each station stop and introducing express services within the BRT infrastructure.  These innovations increased the maximum achieved capacity of a BRT system to 35,000 passengers per hour. The single-lane roads of Istanbul Metrobus had been frequently blocked by Phileas buses breaking down, causing delays for all the buses in a single direction.  After focusing on Mercedes-Benz buses, capacity increased to 45,000 pph. Light rail, by comparison, has reported passenger capacities between 3,500pph (mainly street running) to 19,000pph (fully Grade-separated).

There are conditions that favor light over BRT, but they are fairly narrow. To meet these conditions you would need a corridor with only one available lane in each direction, more than 16,000 passengers per direction per hour but less than 20,000, and a long block length, because the train cannot block intersections. These conditions are rare, but in that specific instance, light rail might have a minimal operational advantage.

The US General Accounting Office GAO summarized in the report "MASS TRANSIT - Bus Rapid Transit Shows Promise", the US FTA provided funding for the construction of HRT and LRT at that time, but very constrained of BRT. The FTA "rather focuses on obtaining and sharing information on projects being pursued by local transit agencies". In spite of this different funding capital costs of BRT systems were lower in many US communities than those of LRT systems and performance often similar. The GAO stated, BRT systems were generally more flexible compared to LRT  and faster.„While transit officials noted a public bias toward Light Rail, 
research has found that riders have no preference for rail over bus when service characteristics are equal.“

Comparison with heavy rail
Fjellstrom/Wright distributed a map of the mid-term goal to expand Bogota's BRT system TransMilenio „so that 85%  of the city's 7 million inhabitants live within 500m distance to a TransMileneo line. Such an expansion program would be unrealistic for a rail-based MRT-system.“ (Bogota's mayor 2001):

Comparison with conventional bus services 

Conventional scheduled bus services use general traffic lanes, which can be slow due to traffic congestion, and the speed of bus services is further reduced by long dwell times. 

Even despite the implementation of Select Bus Service (New York City's version of a bus rapid transit system), dedicated bus lanes, and traffic cameras on the 34th Street corridor, buses on the corridor were still found to travel at an average of 4.5 mph.

In the 1960s, Reuben Smeed predicted that the average speed of traffic in central London would be  without other disincentives such as road pricing, based on the theory that this was the minimum speed that people will tolerate. When the London congestion charge was introduced in 2003, the average traffic speed was indeed  which was the highest speed since the 1970s.

Cost 

The capital costs of implementing BRT are lower than for light rail: a study by the United States General Accounting Office from 2000 found that the average capital cost per mile for busways was $13.5 million while light rail average costs were $34.8 million. However, the total investment varies considerably due to factors such as cost of the roadway, amount of grade separation, station structures, traffic signal systems and vehicles.
  
In the year 2003 a study edited by the german GTZ compared various MRT systems all over the world and concluded ″Bus Rapid Transit (BRT) can provide high-quality, metro-like transit service at a fraction of the cost of other options.″

In the year 2013 the analysis of a database of forty-two BRT projects, nineteen LRT projects, and twentysix

HRT projects specified „In higher income countries ...  an HRT alternative is likely to cost up to 40 times as much as a BRT alternative" and a surface LRT alternative about 4 times that of a BRT alternative.

Operational costs of running a BRT system are generally lower than light rail, though the exact comparison varies, and labor costs depend heavily on wages, which vary between countries. For the same level of ridership and demand, higher labor costs in the developed world relative to developing countries will tend to encourage developed world transit operators to prefer operate services with larger but less frequent vehicles. This will allow the service to achieve the same capacity while minimizing the number of drivers. This may come as a hidden cost to passengers in lower demand routes who experience a significantly lower frequencies and longer waiting times.

In the study done by the GAO, BRT systems usually had lower costs based on "operating cost per vehicle hour", "operating cost per revenue mile", and "operating cost per passenger trip", mainly because of lower vehicle cost and lower infrastructure cost. The initial capital costs of diesel BRT are also much lower than a trolleybus system.

Proponents of light rail argue that during the Belle Epoque railway troops were capable of constructing makeshift rail infrastructure within days or hours, similar to what it takes to establish even the most rudimentary road infrastructure where none previously exists.

An ambitious light rail system runs partly underground, which gives free right-of-way and much faster traffic compared to passing the traffic signals needed in a surface level system. Underground BRT was suggested as early as 1954.  As long as most buses run on diesel, air quality can become a significant concern in tunnels, but the Downtown Seattle Transit Tunnel is an example of using hybrid buses, which switch to overhead electric propulsion while they are underground, eliminating diesel emissions and reducing fuel usage. Alternatives are an elevated busway or an elevated railway, which costs differ.

Criticism 
BRT systems have been widely promoted by non-governmental organizations such as the Shell-funded EMBARQ program, Rockefeller Foundation and Institute for Transportation and Development Policy (ITDP), whose consultant pool includes the former mayor of Bogota (Colombia), Enrique Peñalosa (former president of ITDP).

Supported by contributions of bus-producing companies such as Volvo, the ITDP not only established a proposed "standard" for BRT system implementation, but developed intensive lobby activities around the world to convince local governments to select BRT systems over rail-based transportation models (subways, light trains, etc.).

"Fake" BRT systems (BRT creep) 

Bus rapid transit creep is a phenomenon commonly defined as a bus rapid transit (BRT) system that fails to meet the requirements to be considered "true BRT". These systems are often marketed as a fully realized bus rapid transit system, but end up being described as more of an improvement to regular bus service by proponents of the "BRT creep" term. Notably, the Institute for Transportation and Development Policy (ITDP) published several guidelines in an attempt to define what constitutes the term of "true BRT", known as the BRT Standard, in an attempt to avert this phenomenon.

The most extreme versions of BRT creep lead to systems that cannot even truly be recognized as "Bus Rapid Transit". For example, a rating from the ITDP determined that the Boston Silver Line was best classified as "Not BRT" after local decision makers gradually decided to do away with most BRT-specific features. The study also evaluates New York City's Select Bus Service (which is supposed to be BRT-standard) as "Not BRT".

Environmental issues 

Unlike electric-powered trains commonly used in rapid transit and light rail systems, bus rapid transit often uses diesel- or gasoline-fueled engines. The typical bus diesel engine causes noticeable levels of air pollution, noise and vibration. It is noted however that BRT can still provide significant environmental benefits over private cars. In addition, BRT systems can replace an inefficient conventional bus network for more efficient, faster and less polluting BRT buses. For example, Bogotá previously used 2,700 conventional buses providing transportation to 1.6 million passengers daily, while in 2013 TransMilenio transported 1.9 million passengers using only 630 BRT buses, a fleet less than a quarter in size of the old fleet, that circulates at twice the speed, with a huge reduction in air pollution. 

To reduce direct emissions some systems use alternative forms of traction such as electric or hybrid engines. BRT systems can use trolleybuses to lower air pollution and noise emissions such as those in Beijing and Quito. The price penalty of installing overhead lines could be offset by the environmental benefits and potential for savings from centrally generated electricity, especially in cities where electricity is less expensive than other fuel sources. Trolleybus electrical systems can be potentially reused for future light rail conversion. TransJakarta buses use cleaner compressed natural gas-fueled engines, while Bogotá started to use hybrid buses in 2012; these hybrid systems use regenerative braking to charge batteries when the bus stops and then use electric motors to propel the bus up to 40 km/h, then automatically switching to the diesel engine for higher speeds, which allows for considerable savings in fuel consumption and pollutant dispersion.

Overcrowding and poor quality service  

Many BRT systems suffer from overcrowding in buses and stations as well as long wait times for buses. In Santiago de Chile, the average of the system is six passengers per square meter inside vehicles. Users have reported days where the buses take too long to arrive, and are too overcrowded to accept new passengers. As of June 2017, the system has an approval rating of 15% among commuters, and it has lost 27% of its passengers, who have turned mostly to cars.

In Bogotá the overcrowding was even worse; the average of TransMilenio was eight passengers per square meter. Only 29% felt satisfied with the system. The data also showed that 23% of the citizens agreed with building more TransMilenio lines, in contrast of the 42% who considered that a rapid transit system should be built. Several cases of sexual assault had been reported by female users in TransMilenio. According to a 2012 survey made by the secretary of the woman of Bogota, 64% of women said they had been victims of sexual assault in the system. The system had even been ranked as the most dangerous transport for women. The poor quality of the system had occasioned an increment in the number of cars and motorcycles in the city; citizens preferred these transport means over TransMilenio. According to official data, the number of cars increased from approximately 666,000 in 2005 to 1,586,700 in 2016. The number of motorcycles was also growing, with 660,000 sold in Bogota in 2013, two times the number of cars sold.At the end of 2018 Transmilenio ordered 1383 new buses as a replacement of the older ones in service. 52% were compressed natural gas (CNG) buses made by Scania with Euro 6 emission rating, 48% were diesel engine made by Volvo with Euro 5 emission rating. More (or renewed?) orders have produced an impressive result: "To improve public and environmental health, the City of Bogotá has assembled a fleet of 1,485 electric buses for its public transportation system—placing the city among the three largest e-bus fleets outside of China."In the year 2022 Bogotá has won the Sustainable Transport Award, thanks to their BRT system and their urban cycling strategy.

The system in Jakarta had also been experiencing issues, with complaints of overcrowding in buses and stations and low frequency of the routes. There were extensive safety concerns as well; rampant sexual harassment has been reported, and the fire safety of the buses has been under scrutiny after one of the buses, a Zhongtong imported from China, suddenly and spontaneously caught on fire. The quality of the service was so bad that the then-governor of Jakarta, Basuki Tjahaja Purnama,  in march 2015 publicly apologized for the poor performance of the system.

Failures and reversals 

A criticism of BRT systems was that they might not accomplish their promise of an efficient, rapid flow of passengers along their dedicated bus lanes. The unpopularity of Delhi's BRT(2016) and the riots and spontaneous user demonstrations in Bogotá(2016) raised doubts about the ability of BRTs to tackle issues such as traffic jams. Overcrowded stations and BRT vehicles might fail to keep pace with increased ridership. The speed of increased BRT ridership confirms the research to (the myth of) a general preference for rail over bus, see the end of chapter "Comparison with light rail". Bogota however has regained pace according to the Sustainable Transport Award 2022.

The lack of permanence of BRT has also been criticized, with some arguing that BRT systems can be used as an excuse to build roads that others later try to convert for use by non-BRT vehicles. Examples of this can be found in Delhi, where a BRT system was scrapped, and in Aspen, Colorado, where drivers are lobbying the government to allow mixed-use traffic in former BRT lanes as of 2017, although in other US cities, such as Albuquerque, New Mexico, the opposite is true.

Possible lack of permanence is as well part of a reason for use BRT (chapter above): The system is more flexible.

Experts also attribute a failure of BRT to land use structure. Some Cities that are sprawled and have no mixed use have poor ridership to make BRT economically viable. In Africa, the African Urban Institute criticized the viability of ongoing BRTs across the continent.

Impact 
A 2018 study found that the introduction of a BRT network in Mexico City reduced air pollution (emissions of CO, NOX, and PM10).

See also 

 Autonomous Rail Rapid Transit
 Bus lane
 Park and Ride
 List of bus rapid transit systems
 Quality Bus Corridor
 Queue jump
 Sustainable transport
 Traffic engineering (transportation)
 Transit bus
 Transit Elevated Bus

References

Further reading 
Ghadirifaraz, B., Vaziri, M., Safa, A., & Barikrou, N. (2017). A Statistical Appraisal of Bus Rapid Transit Based on Passengers Satisfaction and Priority Case Study: Isfahan City, Iran (No. 17-05108).
 Poku-Boansi, M and Marsden, G  (2018) Bus Rapid Transit Systems as a Governance Reform Project. Journal of Transport Geography, 70. pp. 193–202. ISSN 0966-6923 DOI: https://doi.org/10.1016/j.jtrangeo.2018.06.005

External links

General information
 The BRT Standard 2014 Edition Institute for Transportation and Development Policy
 Bus Rapid Transit Planning Guide (2007) A very comprehensive 800 guide to creating a successful BRT system by the Institute for Transportation and Development Policy (available in English, Spanish and Portuguese)
 Bus Rapid Transit, Volume 1: Case Studies in Bus Rapid Transit Transportation Research Board
 Bus Rapid Transit, Volume 2: Implementation Guidelines Transportation Research Board
 
 
 
 Across Latitudes and Cultures Bus Rapid Transit An international Centre of Excellence for BRT development
 Transit Capacity and Quality of Service Manual Transportation Research Board
 BRT Technologies: Assisting Drivers Operating Buses on Road Shoulders. University of Minnesota Center for Transportation Studies, Department of Mechanical Engineering

Country-specific information
 Recapturing Global Leadership in Bus Rapid Transit – A Survey of Select U.S. Cities (available for download in pdf) Institute for Transportation & Development Policy (May 2011)
 
 
 Bus Rapid Transit Shows Promise  U.S. General Accounting Office
 The National BRT Institute (USA)

Databases
 Global BRT Data Database of Bus Rapid Transit systems around the world

 
Bus terminology
Public transport by mode
Sustainable transport
Transportation planning
Sustainable urban planning
Types of bus service